Braintree is a local government district in the English county of Essex, with a population (2011 census) of 147,084. Its main town is Braintree. The three towns of the district are Braintree, Halstead and Witham. The district was formed on 1 April 1974 by the merger of the urban districts of Braintree and Bocking, Halstead, and Witham and (for list of parishes) Braintree Rural District and Halstead Rural District.

Council

The council is controlled by the Conservatives who hold 34 of the 49 seats. The council is based at Causeway House on Bocking End in Braintree. The building was purpose-built for the council and opened in 1981.

Wards
There are 26 wards:
Bocking Blackwater
Bocking North
Bocking South
Braintree Central and Beckers Green
Braintree South
Braintree West
Bumpstead
Coggeshall 
Gosfield & Greenstead Green
Great Notley & Black Notley
Halstead St Andrews
Halstead Trinity
Hatfield Peverel and Terling
Hedingham
Kelvedon and Feering
Rayne
Silver End and Cressing
Stour Valley North (includes Ashen and Foxearth)
Stour Valley South (includes Bulmer and Alphamstone)
The Colnes
Three Fields
Witham Central
Witham North
Witham South
Witham West
Yeldham

Arms

References

External links

 Enjoy Braintree District; places to stay, arts, museum, culture events listing by the Braintree Council
 Braintree District Council
 Enjoy Braintree District

 
Non-metropolitan districts of Essex